Lužnica is a settlement (naselje) in the town of Zaprešić, Zagreb County, Croatia. It is thus the smallest settlement by population in Zaprešić. Lužnica is the location of the Lužnica Castle, a baroque castle and touristic point of interest built in 1791 and owned by the Convent of St. Vincent de Paul. The nuns operate nursing home for the elderly. The castle was previously owned by Croatian nobility, namely the  Čikulin, Moscon and Rauch families.

References

External links 
 Convent of St. Vincent de Paul website

Populated places in Zagreb County
Zaprešić